This is a list of the main career statistics of professional French tennis player Alizé Cornet.

Performance timelines

Only main-draw results in WTA Tour, Grand Slam tournaments, Fed Cup/Billie Jean King Cup and Olympic Games are included in win–loss records.

Singles
Current after the 2023 Indian Wells Open.

Doubles
Current after the 2023 Australian Open.

Significant finals

Tier I / Premier Mandatory & Premier 5 / WTA 1000 finals

Singles: 1 (1 runner-up)

WTA career finals

Singles: 15 (6 titles, 9 runner-ups)

Doubles: 7 (3 titles, 4 runner-ups)

 Tournaments sourced from official WTA archives

ITF Circuit finals

Singles: 7 (3 titles, 4 runner–ups)

Doubles: 4 (3 titles, 1 runner–up)

Team competition: 1 (1 title, 1 runner-up)

 Tournaments sourced from official ITF archives

WTA Tour career earnings
Current through the 2022 Australian Open.
{|cellpadding=3 cellspacing=0 border=1 style=border:#aaa;solid:1px;border-collapse:collapse;text-align:center;
|-style=background:#eee;font-weight:bold
|width="90"|Year
|width="100"|Grand Slam <br/ >titles|width="100"|WTA <br/ >titles
|width="100"|Total <br/ >titles
|width="120"|Earnings ($)
|width="100"|Money list rank
|-
|2007
|0
|0
|0
| align="right" |158,605
|95
|-
|2008
|0
|1
|1
| align="right" |506,891
| 34
|-
|2009
|0
|0
|0
| align="right" |349,192
| 62
|-
|2010
|0
|0
|0
| align="right" |208,586
|88
|-
|2011
|0
|0
|0
| align="right" |246,729
| 78
|-
|2012
|0
|1
|1
| align="right" |322,285
|69
|-
|2013
|0
|1
|1
| align="right" |684,893
|34
|-
|2014
|0
|1
|1
| align="right" |1,163,655
|23
|-
|2015
|0
|0
|0
| align="right" |682,321
|46
|-
|2016
|0
|1
|1
| align="right" |626,111
|53
|-
|2017
|0
|0
|0
| align="right" |842,144
|44
|-
|2018
|0
|1
|1
| align="right" |680,149
|55
|-
|2019
|0
|0
|0
| align="right" |622,345
|67
|-
|2020
|0
|0
|0
| align="right" |499,897
|41
|-
|2021
|0
|0
|0
| align="right" |551,017
|69
|-
|2022
|0
|0
|0
| align="right" |421,836
|bgcolor=eee8aa|7
|- style="font-weight:bold;"
|Career
|0
|6
|6
| align="right" |8,668,433
|66
|}

 Career Grand Slam statistics 

 Career Grand Slam seedings 
The tournaments won by Cornet are in boldface, and advanced into finals by Cornet are in italics.

 Best Grand Slam results details 
Grand Slam winners are in boldface', and runner–ups are in italics.

 Record against other players 

Record against top 10 playersCornet's record against players who have been ranked in the top 10. Active players are in boldface.''

No. 1 wins

Top 10 wins

Notes

References 

Cornet, Alizé